Taylor Bennett may refer to:
 Taylor Bennett (American football), American football quarterback and politician
 Taylor Bennett (rapper), American rapper